The Bayeux Calvados-Normandy Award for war correspondents (French: Prix Bayeux Calvados-Normandie des correspondants de guerre), previously the Bayeux-Calvados Awards for war correspondents, is an annual prize awarded since 1994, by the city of Bayeux and the Departamental Council of Calvados and now the Normandy Region in France. Its goal is to pay tribute to journalists who work in dangerous conditions to allow the public access to information about war.

Details
The award was launched as part of the fiftieth anniversary of the Normandy landings. It is awarded in Bayeux, one of the first French cities to be liberated in the Second World War, .

The Bayeux Prize aims to raise public awareness of the profession of war reporter. It takes place during one week each year, in October, including several exhibitions, a book fair, a media forum, discussion evenings, movie screenings and youth-oriented events to participate in education to media. The event focusses on journalism and reporting about a conflict or post-conflict situation, or about an event related to the defense of freedoms and democracy.

The award has had twelve categories since 1994:
Daily news
Magazine
Photojournalism
Radio
Television
Large Format Television
Web journalism
Young reporter
Lower Normandy Secondary School Students’ Prize
Ouest-France – Jean Marin Prize (Print journalism)
Public Prize
Jury Prize

Awards

The Bayeux-Calvados Awards for War Correspondents since 1994.

1994
Daily news prize: Denis Arcand, La Presse
Magazine prize: Philipp von Recklinghausen, Stern
Photojournalism prize: André Soloviev, Associated Press
Radio prize: Alan Little, BBC News
Television prize: Élisabeth Burdot, RTBF
Special prize of the jury: Paul Marchand, Radio Canada

1995
Print journalism prize: Henri Guirchoun, Le Nouvel Observateur
Photojournalism prize: Laurent Van der Stockt, Gamma
Television prize: Ben Brown, BBC News
The Ouest-France – Jean Marin Prize (print journalism): Xavier Gautier, Le Figaro
Special prize of the jury: Patricia Coste, France 2

1996
Print journalism prize: Patrick de Saint Exupéry, Le Figaro
Photojournalism prize: James Nachtwey, Magnum for Time
Radio prize: Nicolas Poincaré, France Inter
Television prize: George Allagiah, BBC News
The Lower Normandy Secondary School Students’: Eric Monier, France 2
The Ouest-France – Jean Marin Prize (print journalism): Olivier Weber, Le Point

1997
Print journalism prize: Alain Bommenel, AFP
Photojournalism prize: Santiago Lyon, Associated Press
Radio prize: François Clémenceau, Europe 1
Television prize: Bob Coen and Amy Merz, CNN News
The Lower Normandy Secondary School Students’: Roger Motte and Martine Laroche-Joubert, France 2
The Ouest-France – Jean Marin Prize (print journalism): Jean-Paul Mari, Le Nouvel Observateur
The Public Prize: Luc Delahaye, Magnum

1998
Print journalism prize: Jean-Paul Mari, Le Nouvel Observateur
Photojournalism prize: Achmad Ibrahim, Associated Press
Radio prize: Nicolas Charbonneau, Europe 1
Television prize: Morad Aïd-Habbouche and Christian Decarné, France 3
The Lower Normandy Secondary School Students’: Morad Aïd-Habbouche and Christian Decarné, France 3
The Ouest-France – Jean Marin Prize (print journalism): Jean Hatzfled, Libération
The Public Prize: Hocine, AFP

1999
Print journalism prize: Gabriel Grüner, Stern
Photojournalism prize: James Nachtwey, Magnum for Time magazine
Radio prize: Isabelle Dor, France Info
Television prize: Fergal Keane, BBC News
The Lower Normandy Secondary School Students’: Fergal Keane, BBC News
The Ouest-France – Jean Marin Prize (print journalism): Javier Espinosa, El Mundo
The Public Prize: Brennan Linsley, SIPA Press

2000
Print journalism prize: Rémy Ourdan, Le Monde
Photojournalism prize: Eric Bouvet, Freelance
Radio prize: Madeleine Mukamabano and Médi Elhag, France Culture
Television prize: Matt Frei and Darren Conway, BBC News
The Lower Normandy Secondary School Students’: Rageh Omaar, BBC News
The Ouest-France – Jean Marin Prize (print journalism): Patrick Saint-Paul, Le Figaro
The Public Prize: Eric Bouvet, Freelance

2001
Print journalism prize: Françoise Spiekermeier, Paris Match
Photojournalism prize: Enric Marti, AP
Radio prize: Gilles Perez, RFI
Television prize: Ben Brown, BBC News
The Lower Normandy Secondary School Students’: Marie-Claude Vogric, France 3
The Ouest-France – Jean Marin Prize (print journalism): Maureen Cofflard, Le Nouvel Observateur
The Public Prize: Jeffrey B. Russel, Corbis Sygma

2002
Print journalism prize: Pierre Barbancey, L'Humanité
Photojournalism prize: Luc Delahaye, Magnum Photos
Radio prize: Arnaud Zajtman, BBC News
Television prize: Gilles Jacquier, Bertrand Coq, Tatiana Derouet, Alexandre Berne, France 2
The Lower Normandy Secondary School Students’: John Simpson, BBC News
The Ouest-France – Jean Marin Prize (print journalism): Jean Kehayan Libération
The Public Prize: Yannis Behrakis, Reuters

2003
Print journalism prize: Sammy Ketz, AFP
Photojournalism prize: Georges Gobet, AFP
Radio prize: Renaud Bernard, France Info
Television prize: Grégoire Deniau and Hervé Paploray, Capa Presse
The Lower Normandy Secondary School Students’: Philippe Lamair, Luc Cauwenberghs, Stefan Janssens, Nathalie Lucien, RTBF
The Ouest-France – Jean Marin Prize (print journalism): Caroline Laurent-Simon, Elle
The Public Prize: Georges Gobet, AFP

2004
Print journalism prize: James Meek and Suzanne Goldenberg, The Guardian (UK)
Photojournalism prize: Karim Sahib, AFP
Radio prize: Andrew Harding – BBC News
Television prize: Paul Wood, Adam Moose Campbell, Yousseff Shomali, Sarah   Halfpenny, Nigel Sawtell, Qais Hayawi, Laith Kawther – BBC News
The Secondary School Students’: Fergal Keane, Glenn Middleton, Jackie Martens, Isaac Mugabi, BBC News
The Ouest-France – Jean Marin Prize (print journalism): Christophe Ayad, Libération
The Public Prize: Jaafar Ashtiyeh, AFP
Jury's Prize: Caroline Laurent-Simon, Elle

2005
Print journalism prize: Vincent Hugeux, L’Express
Photojournalism: Jim MacMillan, AP
Radio prize: Ishbel Matheson and Dan McMillan, BBC News
Television prize: Julian Manyon, Sacha Lomakim, Artem Drabkin, Patrick O’Ryan-Roeder, ITN-ITV News
The Lower Normandy Secondary School Students’: Caroline Sinz, Christian De Carné, Salah Agrabi, Michelle Guilloiseau-Joubair, France 3 
The Ouest-France – Jean Marin Prize (print journalism): Javier Espinosa, El Mundo
The Public Prize: Roger Lemoyne, Maclean's Magazine/Redux Pictures/Alexia Foundation

2006
Print journalism prize: Jon Stephenson, Metro
Photojournalism prize: Jaafar Ashtiyeh, AFP
Radio prize: Alex Last, BBC News
Television prize: Neil Connery, ITN-ITV NEWS
The Lower Normandy Secondary School Students': Jeff Koinange, CNN
The Ouest-France – Jean Marin Prize (print journalism): Javier Espinosa, El Mundo
The Public Prize: Tomas Van Houtryve, Freelance

2007
Print journalism prize: Adrien Jaulmes, La Revue des Deux Mondes / Le Figaro
Photojournalism prize: Mahmud Hams, AFP
Radio news: Angus Crawford, BBC News
Television prize: Alastair Leithead, BBC News
Young reporter prize: Anne Guion, La Vie
The Lower Normandy Secondary School Students’: Orla Guerin, BBC News
The Ouest-France – Jean Marin Prize (print journalism): Benjamin Barthe, Le Monde
The Public Prize: Mahmud Hams, AFP

2008
Print journalism prize: Elizabeth Rubin, New York Times Magazine
Photojournalism prize: Balazs Gardi, VII Network
Radio prize: Mike Thomson, BBC News
Television prize: Dominique Derda – France 2
Young reporter prize: Julius Mwelu, IRIN
Lower Normandy Secondary School Students’: Dominique Derda, France 2
The Ouest-France – Jean Marin Prize (print journalism): Anne Guion, La Vie
Public Prize: Yasuyoshi Chiba, AFP

2009
Print journalism prize: Christina Lamb, The Sunday Times
Photojournalism prize: Walter Astrada, AFP
Radio prize: Tim Franks, BBC News
Television prize: Paul Comiti, TF1
Large Format Television: Jeremy Bowen, BBC News
Young reporter: Mohamed Dahir, AFP
Lower Normandy Secondary School Students’ Prize: Paul Comiti, TF1
The Ouest-France – Jean Marin Prize (print journalism): Célia Mercier – XXI
Public Prize: Jérôme Delay, AP

2010
Print journalism prize: Christophe Boltanski, Le Nouvel Observateur
Photojournalism prize: Véronique de Viguerie, Paris Match / Getty Images
Radio prize: Florence Lozach, Europe 1
Television prize: Danfung Dennis, PBS
Large Format Television: Gilles Jacquier, France 2
Young reporter prize: Miles Amoore, The Sunday Times
Lower Normandy Secondary School Students’ Prize: Danfung Dennis, PBS
The Ouest-France – Jean Marin Prize (print journalism): Mélanis Bois – Elle
Public Prize: Véronique de Viguerie – Paris Match / Getty Imagest

2011
Print journalism prize: Jon Stephenson, Metro Magazine
Photojournalism prize: Yuri Kozyrev, Noor
Radio prize: Etienne Monin – France Info
Television prize: Alex Crawford, Sky News
Large Format Television: Vaughan Smith, Frontline Club
Web journalism: Zoé Lamazou and Sarah Leduc, France 24
Young reporter: Sara Hussein – AFP
Lower Normandy Secondary School Students’ Prize: Alex Crawford, Sky News
The Ouest-France – Jean Marin Prize (print journalism): Mariana Grépinet, Paris Match
Public Prize: Yuri Kozyrev, Noor

2012
Print journalism prize: Javier Espinosa, El Mundo
Photojournalism prize: Aris Messinis, AFP
Radio Prize: Jeremy Bowen, BBC News
Television prize: Nic Robertson, CNN
Large Format Television: Mathieu Mabin, France 24
Web journalism prize: David Wood, Huffington Post
Young reporter prize: Ed Ou, Getty Images
Lower Normandy Secondary School Students’ Prize: Mathieu Mabin, France 24
The Ouest-France – Jean Marin Prize (print journalism): Rémy Ourdan, Le Monde
Public Prize: Manu Brabo, AP

2013
 Print journalism prize: Jean-Philippe Remy (Le Monde)
 Photojournalism prize: Fabio Bucciarelli (AFP)
 Television prize: Sophie Nivelle-Cardinale (TF1)
 Radio prize: Marine Olivesi (CBC)
 Large Format Television: Ben Anderson (BBC News)
 Young reporter prize: Florentin Cassonnet (XXI)
 Web journalism prize: Laurent Van der Stockt and Jean-Philippe Remy (Le Monde)
 Secondary school students’ prize: Sophie Nivelle-Cardinale (TF1)
 The Ouest-France – Jean Marin prize: Wolfgang Bauer (Die Zeit)
 Public prize: Javier Manzano (AFP)

2014

 Photojournalism prize: Mohammed al-Shaikh (AFP) 
 Print journalism prize: Anthony Loyd (Times) 
 Television prize: Lyse Doucet (BBC News)
 Large Format Television: Marcel Mettelsiefen (Arte Reportage)
 Radio prize: Olivier Poujade (France Inter)
 The Ouest-France – Jean Marin prize: Claire Meynial
 Young reporter prize: Alexey Furman
 Secondary school students’ prize: Mathieu Mabin (France 24)
 Web journalism prize: Gerald Holubowicz, Olga Kravets, Maria Morina, Oksana Yushko and Anna Shpakova
 Public prize (photojournalism): Emin Ozmen (Sipa Press)

2015
 Photojournalism prize: Heidi Levine (Sipa Press)
 Print journalism prize: Christopher Reuter (Der Spiegel)
 Television prize: Mikhail Galutsov (Vice)
 Large Format Television: Xavier Muntz (Arte)
 Radio prize: Emma-Jane Kirby (BBC)
 The Ouest-France – Jean Marin prize: Wolfgang Bauer (Die Zeit)
 Young reporter prize: Pierre Sautreuil (L'Obs)
 Secondary school students’ prize: Alex Crawford (Sky News)
 Web journalism prize: Christian Werner (Süddeutsche Zeitung)
 Public prize (photojournalism): Heidi Levine (Sipa Press)

2016
 Photojournalism prize: Yannis Behrakis (Reuters)
 Print journalism prize: Wolfgang Bauer (Die Zeit)
 Television prize, Amnesty International prize: Arnaud Comte and Stéphane Guillemot (France 2)
 Large Format Television: Ayman Oghanna and Warzer Jaff (Vice News)
 Radio prize: Jeremy Bowen (BBC News)
 The Ouest-France – Jean Marin prize: Célia Mercier (Revue XXI)
 Young reporter prize: Mohammed Badra (European Pressphoto Agency)
 Normandy Secondary school students’ prize: Virginie Nguyen Hoang and Dastane Altaïr (France 4)
 Web journalism prize: Guillaume Herbaut and Paul Ouazan (Arte)
 Public prize (photojournalism): Yannis Behrakis (Reuters)

2017
 Print journalism prize:  (Le Figaro)
 Photojournalism prize: Ali Arkadi (VII Photo Agency)
 Television prize: Waad Al-Kateab (Channel 4)
 Radio prize: Gwendoline Debono (Europe 1)
 Large Format Television: Olivier Sarbil (Channel 4 News)
 Young reporter prize: May Jeong (The Intercept)
 Normandy Secondary school students’ prize: Waad Al-Kateab (Channel 4)
 The Ouest-France – Jean Marin prize: Fritz Schaap (Der Spiegel)
 Public prize: Antoine Agoudjian (Le Figaro Magazine)

2018

 Print journalism prize: Kenneth R. Rosen (The Atavist magazine)
 Photojournalism prize: Mahmud Hams (AFP)
 Television prize: Nima Elbagir, Alex Platt and Raja Razek (CNN)
 Radio prize: Gwendoline Debono (Europe 1)
 Large Format Television: Nicolas Bertrand and Thomas Donzel (France 2)
 Young reporter prize: Mushfiqul Alam (freelance)
 Normandy Secondary school students’ prize: Stéphanie Perez, Nicolas Auer and Laetitia Niro (France 2) 
 The Ouest-France – Jean Marin prize: Jean-Philippe Rémy (Le Monde)
 Public prize: Paula Bronstein (Getty images reportage)

References

External links
 

French journalism awards
Awards established in 1994
1994 establishments in France